Vermilion Energy is an international oil and gas producer based in Calgary, Canada. It has operations in North America, Europe and Australia.  Vermilion is listed on the Toronto Stock Exchange and the New York Stock Exchange.

History
Vermilion began in 1994 as Vermilion Resources Ltd, an Alberta focused oil and gas company.  Vermilion had its initial public offering on the Alberta Stock Exchange in April 1996 for $0.10 per share. In 1997, it entered to the French market.

The company changed its status to that of a trust in December 2002 when it became known as Vermilion Energy Trust for eight years; in September 2010, it converted back to a corporation.

In 2004, Vermilion started to operate in the Netherlands.

Vermilion acquired an 18.5% non-operating stake in the Corrib field in the Republic of Ireland from Marathon Oil in 2009, which grew to 20% along with operatorship when Royal Dutch Shell exited the project in 2018. In 2021, Vermilion acquired Equinor's 36.5% stake for $434 million (€382 million), increasing its share of the gas field to 56.5%.

In March 2013, Vermilion began trading on the NYSE under the ticker symbol "VET". Vermilion entered the US market with the acquisition of properties in the Powder River Basin of northeastern Wyoming in 2014. Vermilion acquired a 25% contractual participation interest in a four partner consortium in Germany from GDF Suez in February 2014.

In April 2018, Vermilion announced the acquisition of Spartan Energy, a Saskatchewan-focused light oil producer, for $1.4 billion.

Operations
In Canada, Vermilion's operations are focused in the West Pembina/Drayton Valley region of Alberta and the Northgate Region of southeast Saskatchewan. In West Pembina, Vermilion has the potential for three significant development projects sharing the same surface infrastructure:
 Cardium light oil development (1,800 m depth)
 Mannville liquids-rich gas inventory (2,400 - 2,700 m depth)
 Extensive position in Duvernay liquids-rich gas resource play (3,200 - 3,400 m depth)

Vermilion's activities in the United States are targeting oil and gas development in the Turner Sands tight-oil play.

Vermilion has become the largest oil producer in France. In 2017, under a new climate change bill, Vermilion will no longer be an oil producer for France as of 2040. The company estimates there are more than 1.7 billion barrels of original oil in place in the five biggest conventional oil pools.

The Netherlands is characterized by high impact natural gas drilling and development. Vermilion's natural gas production in the Netherlands is priced of Title Transfer Facility (TTF).

In Germany, the assets include four natural gas producing fields across 11 production licenses, spanning  in the prolific North German Basin.

Vermilion is the operator and minority owner of the Corrib gas project in Ireland. At peak production, the Corrib project has been projected to supply 60-65% of the country's natural gas demand and over 90% of the country's natural gas production. First-gas from Corrib began on 30 December 2015.

Wandoo production receives a premium to Brent Crude pricing. Vermilion originally purchased a 60% operated interest in Wandoo in 2005. The company then purchased the remaining 40% interest in Wandoo in 2007.

See also
Canadian petroleum companies

References

External links 

Companies listed on the Toronto Stock Exchange
Companies based in Calgary
Oil companies of Canada
Non-renewable resource companies established in 1994
Canadian companies established in 1994
Natural gas companies of Canada
Companies listed on the New York Stock Exchange